Interleukin-17 receptor C is a protein that in humans is encoded by the IL17RC gene.

Function 

This gene encodes a single-pass transmembrane protein that shares limited similarity with the interleukin-17 receptor. Multiple alternatively spliced transcript variants encoding different isoforms have been detected for this gene, but the full-length nature of only three have been determined to date.

See also 
 Interleukin-17 receptor

References

Further reading

External links 
 

IL17 family cytokine receptors